The Seven Wonders of the Ancient World, also known as the Seven Wonders of the World or simply the Seven Wonders, is a list of seven notable structures present during classical antiquity. The first known list of seven wonders dates back to the 2nd–1st century BC.

While the entries have varied over the centuries, the seven traditional wonders are the Great Pyramid of Giza, the Colossus of Rhodes, the Lighthouse of Alexandria, the Mausoleum at Halicarnassus, the Temple of Artemis, the Statue of Zeus at Olympia, and the Hanging Gardens of Babylon. Using modern-day countries, two of the wonders were located in Greece, two in Turkey, two in Egypt, and one in Iraq. Of the seven wonders, only the Pyramid of Giza, which is also by far the oldest of the wonders, still remains standing, with the others being destroyed over the centuries. There is scholarly debate over the exact nature of the Hanging Gardens, and there is doubt as to whether they existed at all.

Background
Alexander the Great's conquest of much of the western world in the 4th century BC gave Hellenistic travellers access to the civilizations of the Egyptians, Persians, and Babylonians. Impressed and captivated by the landmarks and marvels of the various lands, these travellers began to list what they saw to remember them.

Instead of "wonders", the ancient Greeks spoke of "theamata" (θεάματα), which means "sights", in other words "things to be seen" (Τὰ ἑπτὰ θεάματα τῆς οἰκουμένης [γῆς] ). Later, the word for "wonder" ("thaumata" θαύματα, "wonders") was used. Hence, the list was meant to be the Ancient World's counterpart of a travel guidebook.

The first reference to a list of seven such monuments was given by Diodorus Siculus. The epigrammist Antipater of Sidon, who lived around or before 100 BC, gave a list of seven "wonders", including six of the present list (substituting the walls of Babylon for the Lighthouse of Alexandria):

Another ancient writer, who, perhaps dubiously, identified himself as Philo of Byzantium, wrote a short account entitled The Seven Sights of the World. The surviving manuscript is incomplete, missing its last pages. Still, from the preamble text, we can conclude that the list of seven sights exactly matches Antipater's (the preamble mentions the location of Halicarnassus, but the pages describing the seventh wonder, presumably the Mausoleum, are missing).

Earlier and later lists by the historian Herodotus ( BC– BC) and the poet Callimachus of Cyrene (–240 BC), housed at the Museum of Alexandria, survive only as references.

The Colossus of Rhodes was the last of the seven to be completed after 280 BC and the first to be destroyed by an earthquake in 226/225 BC. As such, it was already in ruins by the time the list was compiled, and all seven wonders existed simultaneously for less than 60 years.

Scope 
The list covered only the  Mediterranean and Middle Eastern regions, which then comprised the known world for the Greeks. The primary accounts from Hellenistic writers also heavily influenced the places included in the wonders list. Five of the seven entries are a celebration of Greek accomplishments in construction, with the exceptions being the Pyramids of Giza and the Hanging Gardens of Babylon.

Wonders

Influence

Arts and architecture

The seven wonders on Antipater's list won praises for their notable features, ranging from superlatives of the highest or largest of their types, to the artistry with which they were executed. Their architectural and artistic features were imitated throughout the Hellenistic world and beyond.

The Greek influence in Roman culture, and the revival of Greco-Roman artistic styles during the Renaissance caught the imagination of European artists and travellers. Paintings and sculptures alluding to Antipater's list were made, while significant numbers of adventurers travelled to the actual sites to personally witness the wonders. Legends circulated to further complement the superlatives of the wonders.

Modern lists
Of Antipater's wonders, the only one that has survived to the present day is the Great Pyramid of Giza. Its brilliant white stone facing had survived intact until around 1300 AD, when local communities removed most of the stonework for building materials. The existence of the Hanging Gardens has not been proven, though theories abound. Records and archaeology confirm the existence of the other five wonders. The Temple of Artemis and the Statue of Zeus were destroyed by fire, while the Lighthouse of Alexandria, Colossus, and tomb of Mausolus were destroyed by earthquakes. Among the surviving artefacts are sculptures from the tomb of Mausolus and the Temple of Artemis, currently kept in the British Museum in London.

The listing of seven of the most marvellous architectural and artistic human achievements continued beyond the Ancient Greek times to the Roman Empire, the Middle Ages, the Renaissance and to the modern age. The Roman poet Martial and the Christian bishop Gregory of Tours had their versions. Reflecting the rise of Christianity and the factor of time, nature and the hand of man overcoming Antipater's seven wonders, Roman and Christian sites began to figure on the list, including the Colosseum, Noah's Ark and Solomon's Temple. In the 6th century, a list of seven wonders was compiled by St. Gregory of Tours: the list included the Temple of Solomon, the Pharos of Alexandria and Noah's Ark.

Modern historians, working on the premise that the original Seven Ancient Wonders List was limited in its geographic scope, also had their versions to encompass sites beyond the Hellenistic realm—from the Seven Wonders of the Ancient World to the Seven Wonders of the World. The "seven wonders" label has spawned innumerable versions among international organizations, publications and individuals based on different themes—works of nature, engineering masterpieces, constructions of the Middle Ages, etc. Its purpose has also changed from just a simple travel guidebook or a compendium of curious places to a list of sites to defend or preserve.

See also
Eighth Wonder of the World, about attempted additions to the famous ancient list.
Wonders of the World, about similar lists made throughout the ages.
Seven Wonders of the World (1956 film)
7 Wonders of the Ancient World (video game) (2007 video game)

References

External links

"Seven Ancient Wonders of the World" on The History Channel website. Also includes links to medieval, modern and natural wonders.
Parkin, Tim, Researching Ancient Wonders: A Research Guide, from the University of Canterbury, New Zealand. – a collection of books and Internet resources with information on seven ancient wonders.
"Eternal wonder of humanity's first great achievements", by Jonathan Glancey in The Guardian, 10 March 2007

 
Ancient history
Former buildings and structures
7 Seven Wonders of the Ancient World
Ancient technology
History of construction

de:Weltwunder#Die sieben Weltwunder der Antike